Metin Yenal is a German actor who played the character of Karl in the 1988 Doctor Who serial Silver Nemesis.

References

20th-century German male actors
German male television actors
living people
year of birth missing (living people)